The 2018 Thai FA Cup Final was the final match of the 2018 Thai FA Cup, the 25th season of a Thailand's football tournament organised by Football Association of Thailand. It was played at the Supachalasai Stadium in Bangkok, Thailand on 27 October 2018, between Chiangrai United a big team from the Northern part and Buriram United a big team from the Northeastern part of Thailand.

Road to the final

Note: In all results below, the score of the finalist is given first (H: home; A: away; T1: Clubs from Thai League; T2: Clubs from Thai League 2; T3: Clubs from Thai League 3; T4: Clubs from Thai League 4.

Match

Details

Assistant referees:
 Phattarapong Kijsathit
 Rawut Nakharit
Fourth official:
 Songkran Bunmeekiat
Match Commissioner:
 Pakasit Suwannanon
Referee Assessor:
 Mongkol Rungklai

Winner

Prizes for winner
 A champion trophy.
 5,000,000 THB prize money.
 Qualification to 2019 AFC Champions League Preliminary round 2.
 Qualification to 2019 Thailand Champions Cup.

Prizes for runners-up
 1,000,000 THB prize money.

See also
 2018 Thai League
 2018 Thai League 2
 2018 Thai League 3
 2018 Thai League 4
 2018 Thai FA Cup
 2018 Thai League Cup

References

External links
Thai FA cup snapshot from Thai League official website

2018
2